George Shiu Raj is an Indo-Fijian former politician, who served as Minister for Multi-Ethnic Affairs from 2001 to 30 September 2004, when he resigned amid accusations of misuse of funds.  At the time, he was the only Indo-Fijian minister in the Cabinet of Prime Minister Laisenia Qarase.  On 8 September 2005, he was acquitted of charges of conspiracy to defraud the government and of obtaining money under false pretenses, and Prime Minister Qarase announced his decision to reappoint Raj to the Cabinet.  He was duly sworn in by Vice-President Ratu Joni Madraiwiwi on 13 September.

Following the parliamentary election held on 6–13 May 2006, in which Raj retained his seat with a large majority, Prime Minister Qarase appointed him Minister for Women, Social Welfare, and Poverty Alleviation.  This appointment was harshly criticised by Fiji Labour Party leader Mahendra Chaudhry.  In a parliamentary debate on 8 June 2006, Chaudhry called the appointment of a male to head the Ministry for Women an "act of violence" against women, and called on Raj to resign.

The misappropriation allegations and resignation 
The allegations centred on a visit to India that Raj made early in 2004.  According to a report from the Auditor-General, Raj had chosen not to fly business class, which the government had paid for, and had opted for the cheaper economy class.  Raj had allegedly pocketed the difference, instead of refunding it to the government.  He had also allegedly taken his official driver to India, and had taken excess per diem for his own extended stay there.

Raj told the Fiji Times that he was innocent of the charges, and that he had chosen to resign in order to protect the government.  "I have great respect for the Speaker of the House, the Parliament, Prime Minister and the nation," he said, "and don't want such allegations to tarnish their image.  The only proper action is to resign voluntarily while the legal process and police investigations take place." He was sure that the ensuing police investigation would clear him.

Prime Minister Qarase accepted the resignation with regret, saying that Raj was one of his best-performing ministers.  He announced that rather than replace Raj, he would take on responsibility for the Multi-Ethnic Affairs portfolio himself, pending the outcome of the police investigation.  If exonerated by the inquiry, Raj might then be reinstated, Qarase said.  He reiterated this position on 16 December 2004.

Acquittal and reinstatement 
On 23 August 2005, Raj appeared in court along with Sashi Sanjeev Pal, the managing director of Hunts Travel, on charges of conspiracy to defraud the government and of obtaining money (F$10,000) by false pretenses. Raj and Pal pleaded not guilty to both charges.

The trial of Raj and Pal began on 5 September.  Department of Public Prosecutions lawyer Daniel Gounder told the three trial assessors that Raj and Pal had defrauded the government not once, but twice.  Between 30 December 2001 and January 2002, the Prime Minister's Office authorized Raj to travel to India on business class tickets, Gounder said.  He alleged that rather than using the money (F$8363) to purchase a business class ticket for himself, he colluded with Pal to purchase three economy class tickets for himself, his wife Praveena Kumari, and one other man, Pundit Jayant Maharaj.  On a second occasion, he alleged, Raj was again sponsored to fly business class, but opted for economy class, and pocketed the difference.

On 8 September 2005, Justice Gerard Winter declared that Raj and Pal had no case to answer and dismissed the charges.  Winter ruled that there was no legal obligation for Cabinet Ministers to travel business class, and that payment for Raj's trips were paid by the Fijian government, through the Indian government; at no time had Raj himself obtained any money illegally or dishonestly.  Winter said that Raj had acted transparently and had hidden nothing.  The fact that he had voluntarily resigned from the Cabinet and paid back the money he allegedly owed showed him to be a man of honesty and integrity, Winter said.

An emotional Raj thanked God, the Prime Minister, and his constituents for standing by him.  He had always known that truth would prevail, he said.  He encouraged other politicians to resign as he had, should they be accused of any kind of wrongdoing, and said he was glad to have cleared his name.  "Now that I've cleared my name I can get my reputation back," he said.  Prime Minister Qarase told the Fiji Village news service that he would begin the process of readmitting Raj to the Cabinet in mid-September.  The Department of Prosecutions, however, said that it would study the ruling and consider an appeal.

Raj's acquittal generated criticism from a number of quarters.  Opposition Leader Mahendra Chaudhry said that he still believed that Raj had abused state funds.  "Using State funds is a case of abuse. He should not have used it and nothing will change that fact. Abuse is abuse," Chaudhry said on 12 September.  The same day, National Alliance Party Secretary Filipe Bole said the court's decision was improper.  He endorsed the judgement of Auditor-General Eroni Vatuloka that state entitlements were for the purpose of fulfilling civil service duties, and were not transferable to others.  He also shared Vatuloka's concerns that the judgement would adversely impact other court cases involving misappropriation of funds.  Also on 12 September, the office of the Director of Public Prosecutions announced that the ruling would be appealed, as Opposition Leader Chaudhry had urged.  The appeal was duly filed with the Court of Appeal on 12 April 2006.  Lawyer Hemendra Nagin announced that he would represent Raj at the appeal, expected to be held in July.

Other controversies 
On 10 August 2005, Parliamentarian Lekh Ram Vayeshnoi of the opposition Fiji Labour Party accused Raj of cheating farmers in Ra Province of their sugarcane earnings by offering them loans.  Raj denied the accusation, and invoked parliamentary standing orders.  He said that most of the farmers he had helped were indigenous Fijians, and that many had increased their production from 50 tons to 200 or 300 tons.

Background and career 
Raj was first elected to represent the Ra Open Constituency in the House of Representatives as an independent candidate at the 1999 general election.  He was appointed Minister for Multi-Ethnic Affairs in the interim Cabinet that was formed in the wake of the Fiji coup of 2000, and retained his seat as a candidate of the newly formed Soqosoqo Duavata ni Lewenivanua (SDL) in the election held to restore democracy in September 2001. Raj generated outrage among his fellow Indo-Fijians in his Maiden speech (the speech typically made by a newly elected parliamentarian in Commonwealth countries).  He said that Fiji had been given to the Fijian people by God and that they, not Indo-Fijians or others, were therefore entitled to govern the country.  Many saw him as grovelling before the strongly pro-ethnic Fijian Qarase.

Soqosoqo Duavata ni Lewenivanua politicians
Indian members of the House of Representatives (Fiji)
Living people
Government ministers of Fiji
Politicians from Ra Province
Fijian politicians of Indian descent
Year of birth missing (living people)